Clarence R. Mattei (November 13, 1883 – April 2, 1945) was an American portrait painter.

Life
Mattei was born on November 13, 1883, in San Luis Obispo County, California. His father Felix was an immigrant from Switzerland who first managed a hotel in Cayucos before founding Mattei's Tavern in Los Olivos. Mattei was trained in Paris.

Mattei became an oil painter as well as a black and white sketcher, with studios in New York and in Santa Barbara, California. Over the course of his career, he did hundreds of portraits.

Mattei married Merle Wilhoit. He died on April 2, 1945, in Santa Barbara, at age 61. His work can be seen at the Santa Barbara Historical Museum.

Further reading

References

1883 births
1945 deaths
American people of Swiss descent
People from Santa Barbara, California
Painters from California
American portrait painters
19th-century American painters
20th-century American painters